Philip James Bailey (born May 8, 1951) is an American R&B, soul, gospel and funk singer, songwriter and percussionist, best known as an early member and one of the two lead singers (along with group founder Maurice White) of the band Earth, Wind & Fire. Noted for his four-octave vocal range and distinctive falsetto register, Bailey has won seven Grammy Awards. He was inducted into the Rock and Roll Hall of Fame and the Vocal Group Hall of Fame as a member of Earth, Wind & Fire.  Bailey was also inducted into the Songwriters Hall of Fame for his work with the band.

Bailey has released several solo albums. Chinese Wall from 1984, which received a Grammy Award nomination for Best R&B Vocal Performance, Male, included the international hit, "Easy Lover", a duet with Phil Collins.

In May 2008, Bailey was awarded an Honorary Doctorate of Music from Berklee College of Music at Berklee's Commencement Ceremony where he was the commencement speaker.

Life and career

Early days
Bailey was born and raised in Denver, Colorado. He attended Denver's East High School. He later attended the Metropolitan State University of Denver and the University of Colorado thereafter. Bailey was also in a local R&B band called Friends & Love. Some of Bailey's early influences included jazz musicians such as Miles Davis, John Coltrane and Max Roach, the Motown sound, in particular the music of Stevie Wonder and he was also largely influenced by female singers such as Sarah Vaughan and Dionne Warwick.

Earth, Wind & Fire

In 1972, while attending the University of Colorado, Bailey was invited to join the band Earth, Wind & Fire by founder and bandleader Maurice White.  Bailey was the featured lead vocalist on popular Earth, Wind & Fire songs as "Devotion", "Keep Your Head to the Sky", "Reasons", "Fantasy", "Star", "I've Had Enough", "Turn on (The Beat Box)" and "Guiding Lights". He also shared lead vocals with Maurice White on such EWF hits as "Shining Star", "Getaway", "September", "Sing A Song", "Serpentine Fire", "Saturday Nite", “Can’t Hide Love,” “That’s the Way of the World,” “Sing a Song,” and sang lead with both White and the girl group The Emotions on their classic disco collaboration "Boogie Wonderland".

With Maurice White's retirement from the road, Bailey became the on-stage leader of Earth, Wind & Fire, performing alongside longtime members, bassist Verdine White and vocalist/percussionist Ralph Johnson.

During EWF's live performances, Bailey will sing in his falsetto, and then at times switch to the tenor originally sung by Maurice White, showing off his vocal prowess and versatility.

Solo albums
During 1983, Bailey issued his debut studio album, titled Continuation, on Columbia Records. The album reached No. 19 on the US Billboard Top R&B Albums chart, No. 36 on the Dutch Pop Albums chart and No. 31 on the Swedish Pop Albums chart. Martin Basch of the Boston Globe declared "this is the rare R&B dance album where each cut is outstanding". Hugh Wyatt of the New York Daily News also called Continuation "a top-notch recording".

An album cut titled "I Know" rose to No. 10 on the US Billboard Hot R&B Songs chart.

Bailey issued his second solo album, a gospel album titled The Wonders of His Love on Myrrh Records in 1984. During 1984, Bailey also released his third solo album, titled Chinese Wall on Columbia. The album reached No. 22 on the Billboard 200 chart and No. 10 on the Billboard Top R&B/Hip-Hop Albums chart. The album was certified Gold in the US by the RIAA. A duet with Phil Collins entitled "Easy Lover", rose to No. 1 on the UK Pop Singles chart and No. 2 on the Billboard Hot 100 chart.

During 1986 Bailey went on to issue his fourth studio album, titled Inside Out on Columbia. The album reached No. 30 on the US Billboard Top R&B Albums chart, No. 29 on the Swiss Pop Albums chart and No. 30 on the Swedish Pop Albums chart. Carlo Wolff of the Boston Globe wrote "Bailey's most coherent and relaxed solo album chronicles his walk through city streets, his eyes turned toward the heavens". Thom Duffy of the Orlando Sentinel said "on this new album, Bailey aims for a polished yet punchy funk and ballad style."

A single from the album entitled "State of the Heart" reached No. 20 on the US Billboard Hot R&B Songs chart.

During 1994, Bailey issued his self titled fifth studio album on Zoo Entertainment. Artists including Brian McKnight, Chuckii Booker and PM Dawn guested on the LP. Carol Cooper of Newsday wrote, "Philip Bailey takes another step forward for neo-traditionalism in black music, with the sensitive gentleman-crooner triumphantly ascendant."
Michael Eric Dyson of Rolling Stone stated "In the hands of a lesser talent, some of these songs might barely seep through the cracks, less than memorable fare conjured up to please a legend. But Bailey's grace and magic, apparent throughout, redeem the recordings." Dyson added "What's remarkable above all on this album is that Bailey's brilliant falsetto retains its sweet purity, even as he employs more of a pleasing baritone than he has revealed before. While that alone doesn't compensate for some of the just-OK stuff he has to work with, it delights nonetheless."

The album cut "Here With Me" rose to No. 33 on the Billboard Adult R&B Songs chart.

Bailey went on to release his first jazz album, titled Dreams in 1999 on Heads Up International records. The album featured artists such as Gerald Albright, Grover Washington, Jr. and Pat Metheny. It reached No. 43 on the Billboard Jazz Albums chart. Paula Edelstein of All About Jazz said "Philip sings with the spiritual essence from on high and with the finesse and soul of the Song Master that he is. This CD is worth the wait". Al Hunter Jr. of the Philadelphia Daily News wrote ""Dreams" is an excellent showcase for Bailey" adding "Bailey serves up a jazz-flavored disc that is as impressive as his four-octave singing range."
During 2002 he released Soul on Jazz, his sophomore jazz album once again on Heads Up. The album rose to No. 45 upon the Billboard Jazz Albums chart. Christopher Loudon of Jazz Times proclaimed "reinterpreting jazz treasures both familiar and lesser-known, he moves from triumph to triumph." Eugene Holley Jr. of Vibe also stated "backed by a swinging combo, Bailey's vivid vocals extend to realms beyond category."
Bailey then issued in 2019 his third jazz album entitled Love Will Find A Way on Verve Records. That album reached No. 1 on both the Billboard Top Jazz Albums chart and the Billboard Contemporary Jazz Albums chart.
Bailey also won Soul Act of the Year at the 2020 Jazz FM Awards.

Gospel
Bailey featured on Andraé Crouch's 1979 Grammy winning album I'll Be Thinking of You and alongside Maurice White on Walter Hawkins' 1980 Grammy nominated album, The Hawkins Family.

In 1980, Bailey joined with friends, Deniece Williams, Billy Davis and Marilyn McCoo to present a gospel show at a popular Los Angeles club named The Roxy. The show was called "Jesus At the Roxy". Williams later reported that "God did something miraculous. Over three hundred people were saved." After that, both Bailey and Williams decided to pursue careers in Christian music.

During 1984, Bailey issued his first gospel album titled The Wonders of His Love on Myrrh Records. The album reached No. 13 on the Billboard Christian Albums chart and No. 17 on the Billboard Top Gospel Albums chart. The Wonders of His Love was also Grammy nominated in the category of Best Inspirational Performance.

His second gospel album Triumph was released in 1986 on Horizon Records. The LP reached No. 18 on the Top Christian Albums chart and No. 33 on the Billboard Top Gospel Albums chart. Triumph also won a Grammy for Best Gospel Performance, Male.

During 1989 he released his third gospel album titled Family Affair on Myrrh Records. The album reached No. 37 on the Billboard Top Gospel Albums chart.

Bailey later played percussion and sang on the King Baptist Church Mass Choir's 1990 album Holding on to Jesus' Hand.

Work with other artists
Bailey sang on Jazz guitarist Alphonso Johnson's 1976 LP Yesterday's Dreams. He later played percussion alongside Verdine White on bass upon the track "Tahiti Hut" composed by both Maurice White and Eumir Deodato from Deodato's 1978 album Love Island. He also sang on Ronnie Laws' 1978 album Flame.

Bailey went on to produce R&B Band Kinsman Dazz's 1978 debut LP Kinsman Dazz and work as an arranger and guest artist on their sophomore 1979 album Dazz. As a band, Kinsman Dazz later became known as the Dazz Band. Bailey also collaborated as a vocalist with Ramsey Lewis on his 1980 LP Routes, Stanley Turrentine on his 1981 album Tender Togetherness and Deniece Williams on her 1983 Grammy nominated album I'm So Proud.

As well he guested on Stevie Wonder's 1985 In Square Circle album, Kenny Loggins' 1985 LP Vox Humana, Ray Parker Jr.'s 1987 album After Dark and Anita Pointer's 1987 LP Love for What It Is. Bailey also collaborated with Julio Iglesias on his 1988 album Non Stop, Deniece Williams on her 1988 album As Good As It Gets and collaborated with Little Richard on the title tune of the soundtrack to the 1988 feature film Twins. That song reached No. 16 on the Dutch Pop Singles chart and No. 36 on the Belgian Pop Singles chart. Twins was also nominated for a Golden Globe in the category of Best Original Song.

He later featured on Nancy Wilson's 1989 LP A Lady with a Song, Dianne Reeves' 1990 album Never Too Far and George Duke and Stanley Clarke's 1990 LP 3. Bailey also guested on jazz group Fourplay's 1991 self-titled debut album, Ronnie Laws' 1992 LP Deep Soul, George Duke's 1992  album Snapshot and Fourplay's 1993 sophomore LP Between the Sheets.

Bailey then featured on Chante Moore's 1994 album A Love Supreme, Keiko Matsui's 1994 LP Doll, Doc Powell's 1996 album Inner City Blues, George Duke's 2000 Grammy nominated album Cool, Boney James's 2006 LP Shine, Deniece Williams' 2007 album Love Niecy Style and Gerald Albright's 2008 Grammy nominated LP Sax for Stax.

He then featured on the song Fool for You from CeeLo Green's 2010 album The Lady Killer. Fool for You got to No. 1 on the Billboard Adult R&B Songs chart and No. 13 on the Billboard Hot R&B/Hip-Hop Songs chart. That song also won two Grammy awards in the categories of Best Traditional R&B Performance and Best R&B Song. Bailey later featured on Nathan East's 2017 LP Reverence. A cover of "Serpentine Fire" from that album featuring Bailey, Verdine White and Ralph Johnson reached No. 17 on the Billboard Smooth Jazz Songs chart. Bailey later made a guest appearance on Chick Corea's 2018 album Chinese Butterfly.

He also sang uncredited vocals on Travis Scott's "Stop Trying to Be God". The song also features fellow musicians Stevie Wonder, Kid Cudi, and James Blake and appeared on Scott's 2018 album Astroworld.

In other media
Bailey appeared in a 1995 Chicago staging of Raisin, the Broadway musical based on A Raisin In The Sun.

On October 27, 2007, Bailey sang "God Bless America" during the seventh-inning stretch in Game 3 of the 2007 World Series held at Coors Field, Denver, Colorado. This was the first World Series game that was ever played in his hometown of Denver. He also threw out the ceremonial first pitch on June 30, 2012, in an MLB game between the Tampa Bay Rays and the Detroit Tigers held at Tropicana Field, St. Petersburg, Florida.

Accolades

Grammy Awards
The Grammy Awards are awarded annually by the National Academy of Recording Arts and Sciences. Bailey has received one award out of four solo nominations.

Discography

 Continuation (1983)
 The Wonders of His Love (1984)
 Chinese Wall (1984)
 Triumph (1986)
 Inside Out (1986)
 Family Affair (1989)
 Philip Bailey (1994)
 Life and Love (1998)
 Dreams (1999)
 Soul on Jazz (2002)
 Love Will Find a Way (2019)

Bibliography

References

External links

 Philip Bailey Official website
 
 Philip Irvin Bailey. discogs.com

1951 births
Living people
20th-century African-American male singers
20th-century Christians
21st-century African-American male singers
21st-century Christians
African-American Christians
African-American male actors
African-American pianists
African-American songwriters
American male songwriters
Songwriters from Colorado
American funk singers
American jazz singers
American keyboardists
American percussionists
American pop rock singers
American rhythm and blues singers
American soul singers
Earth, Wind & Fire members
Grammy Award winners
Heads Up International artists
Singers from Denver
Singers with a four-octave vocal range
American male actors
20th-century American drummers
American male drummers
21st-century American drummers
20th-century American pianists
American tenors
American male pianists
American male jazz musicians
Kennedy Center honorees